Kalinikos Kreanga (born March 8, 1972) is a Greek (formerly Romanian) table tennis player. Born as Călin Creangă, he chose to defect from Communist-ruled Romania at the age of 17 (with his father) while he was participating in the European Table Tennis Youth Championships in Luxembourg in 1989.

Born in Bistriţa, Romania, Kreanga started to play table tennis at the age of 7. His first coach was Gheorghe Bozga, who would later discover Mihaela Steff.

While in Luxembourg, he received an offer to play in Greece, so he decided to move there. Being a minor, he quickly acquired Greek citizenship, and changed his name to Kalinikos Kreanga.

He has been one of the dominant European table tennis players since the beginning of the 1990s, and uses the shakehand grip to hold the racket. His favorite offensive weapons seem to be the forehand topspin and an incredibly strong backhand topspin. His backhand topspin is regarded as one of the most devastating in the world, not limited by its unorthodox technique. 

In 2004 he has reached No 7 of World Ranking.

Team history 

 A.C. Zografou (Greece) (until 1995)
 Finower TTC (1995/96; 2. Bundesliga, Germany)
 Royal Villette Charleroi, (Belgium), since 1996)
 TTC Weinheim (2.BL, Germany)
 TTF Ochsenhausen (Germany)
 Montpellier TT (France)
 Hennebont (France)

Results 
Bronze medal in the mixed doubles competition at the World Championships, Chiba City, 1991.

Winner of the European Championships in mixed doubles (1992) and men's doubles (1994).
Runner-up in men's singles (2002).

Bronze medal in the singles competition at the World Championships, Paris, 2003.

Runner-up at the Men's World Cup in 2003 and 2004.

Winner of the Europe Top-12, 2011.

See also
 List of Eastern Bloc defectors

Notes

Greek male table tennis players
Romanian male table tennis players
1972 births
Sportspeople from Bistrița
Romanian defectors
Romanian emigrants to Greece
Greek people of Romanian descent
Living people
Table tennis players at the 1996 Summer Olympics
Table tennis players at the 2000 Summer Olympics
Table tennis players at the 2004 Summer Olympics
Table tennis players at the 2008 Summer Olympics
Table tennis players at the 2012 Summer Olympics
Olympic table tennis players of Greece
Table tennis players at the 2015 European Games
European Games competitors for Greece
Romanian emigrants to Luxembourg